Klaus Naumann (born 25 May 1939 in Munich) is a retired German General, who served as Chief of Staff of the Bundeswehr, the German armed forces, from 1991 to 1996, and as Chairman of the NATO Military Committee from 1996 to 1999, succeeding the British general Richard Frederick Vincent, Baron Vincent of Coleshill. He testified against Slobodan Milošević in the International Criminal Tribunal for the former Yugoslavia. He attended as a course member the Royal College of Defence Studies in London.

Awards and decorations
Naumann is considered the most decorated German soldier since World War II. His medals and decorations include:
 Great Cross of Merit of the Federal Republic of Germany
 Badge of Honour of the Bundeswehr in Gold
 Manfred Wörner Medal
 Grand Officer of the Legion of Honour (France)
 Grand Cross of Military Merit in white (Spain)
 Honorary Knight Commander of the Order of the British Empire
 Grand Officer of the Order of the Crown (Belgium)
 Commander of the Legion of Merit (United States)
 Commander's Cross with Star of the Royal Norwegian Order of Merit
 Defense Medal First Class (Hungary)
 Grand Officer of the Order of Leopold (Belgium)
 Grand Officer of the Order of Orange-Nassau (Netherlands)
 Commander with Star of the Order of the Lion of Finland

References

External links

Biography on BMVg website

Musicians from Munich
1939 births
Living people
Bundeswehr generals
Graduates of the Royal College of Defence Studies
Inspectors General of the Bundeswehr
Knights Commander of the Order of Merit of the Federal Republic of Germany
Commanders of the Legion of Merit
Grand Officiers of the Légion d'honneur
Knights Commander of the Order of the British Empire
Recipients of the Order of the White Lion
Recipients of the Military Order of the Cross of the Eagle, Class I
Recipients of the Badge of Honour of the Bundeswehr
Honorary Knights Commander of the Order of the British Empire
Grand Officers of the Order of the Crown (Belgium)
Grand Officers of the Order of Orange-Nassau
Commanders of the Order of the Lion of Finland
NATO military personnel
Generals of the German Army
Bundeswehr Command and Staff College alumni
Military personnel from Munich